Open Season: Scared Silly (also known as Open Season 4: Scared Silly or simply Open Season 4) is a 2015 American computer-animated comedy film produced by Sony Pictures Animation, with animation provided by Rainmaker Entertainment. It is the fourth installment of the Open Season film series following 2006’s Open Season, 2008’s Open Season 2 and 2010’s Open Season 3. It also serves as a direct sequel to the first film, ignoring the events of the previous two installments.

The film was directed by David Feiss, creator of Cartoon Network and Hanna-Barbera's Cow and Chicken and I Am Weasel, and produced by John Bush, with music by Rupert Gregson-Williams and Dominic Lewis. With the exception of Melissa Sturm (reprising her role as Giselle from the third film) and Michelle Murdocca (reprising her role as Maria from the previous three installments), none of the voice cast from the previous installments returned for this film. It theatrically premiered in Turkey on December 18, 2015 and was released direct-to-video in North America on March 8, 2016.

Plot
After the events of the third film, Elliot tells a campfire story about the legend of the Wailing Wampus Werewolf that is said to live in the Timberline National Forest one night. Boog is terrified by the story and decides to "chicken out" of their annual camping trip until he knows that the werewolf is gone. Determined to help Boog overcome his fears, Elliot, Mr. Weenie, and the other woodland animals band together to scare the fear out of Boog and uncover the mystery of the Wailing Wampus Werewolf.

Former hunter Shaw, now a tour guide, returns to Timberline to get revenge on Boog and Elliot for defeating him and witnesses an unseen creature in the forest (which turns out to be Ian, a deer who is Elliot’s rival, in a disguise). Shaw begs Gordy to reopen hunting season and he reluctantly does so. Despite being told to only hunt down the werewolf, Shaw becomes determined to not only catch it, but also hunt down Boog and Elliot. To carry out his plan, Shaw recruits his old friends Ed and Edna, the owners of Poutine Palace, a restaurant serving poutine. Meanwhile, a heartbroken Elliot catches the werewolf by himself after Boog angrily breaks up with him. As Boog walks through the forest, Elliot’s girlfriend Giselle catches up to him and tries to convince him that Elliot was trying to help him overcome his fear and that Elliot is headed toward Dead Bear Gulch, but fails.

Meanwhile, a starving Mr. Weenie starts to believe that he is the werewolf. At Dead Bear Gulch, Elliot and Mr. Weenie are both caught by the werewolf, who is actually Shaw in a costume; fortunately, Boog and his friends leap to the rescue. Shaw is eventually overpowered and defeated, permanently shutting down open season. Gordy meets up with Boog, having recognized the bear's handiwork in defeating Shaw, and rewards him with a few treats. The animals then discover that the werewolf is real, but Elliot befriends him by dancing with him as he joins their campout. The next morning, Bobbie and Bob happily return to their RV with Mr. Weenie, and Bobbie tells Mr. Weenie that today is his birthday. The werewolf asks Boog to wear the female werewolf costume one more time, but Boog angrily refuses.

Cast

Production
Open Season: Scared Silly was first announced on June 11, 2015. The first trailer was released on November 1, 2015.

Release
Like its predecessors Open Season 2 and Open Season 3, the film was released theatrically in different countries:

 Turkey – December 18, 2015
 Hungary – December 31, 2015
 Romania – February 5, 2016
 Russia – June 2, 2016
 Ukraine – June 2, 2016
 Slovakia – September 1, 2016
 Czech Republic – September 8, 2016

Home media
The film was released on DVD and Blu-ray in the United States and Canada on March 8, 2016, by Sony Pictures Home Entertainment (under Columbia Pictures).

Reception
Renee Schonfeld from Common Sense Media gave it a positive review, saying, "Talented voice actors, along with a clever story and script, make this very funny film a cut above most direct-to-DVD fare for kids and families".

Possible sequel
In an interview with ComicBook in 2016, Feiss hinted at the possibility of a fifth film stating: "You can never be too sure, but I have a feeling that we will be seeing an Open Season 5. Everybody likes the characters and the movie and the way it turned out, so I would be surprised if there wasn’t an Open Season 5. I know people want to do another. "

References

External links

 
 
 
 
 

2015 direct-to-video films
2010s American animated films
2010s buddy comedy films
2010s children's comedy films
2015 computer-animated films
American direct-to-video films
American children's animated comedy films
American computer-animated films
American sequel films
Animated films about bears
Animated films about revenge
Canadian direct-to-video films
Canadian animated feature films
Canadian children's adventure films
Canadian children's comedy films
Canadian children's animated films
Canadian sequel films
Open Season (franchise)
Direct-to-video prequel films
Direct-to-video interquel films
Rainmaker Studios films
Sony Pictures Animation films
Sony Pictures direct-to-video films
Werewolves in animated film
Films scored by Rupert Gregson-Williams
Films scored by Dominic Lewis
2015 comedy films
2015 films
2010s English-language films
2010s Canadian films
American prequel films